The 2015 World Archery Youth Championships was the 14th edition of World Youth Archery Championships. The event was held in Yankton, South Dakota, United States between 8–14 June 2013, and was organised by World Archery. Junior events were held for those under 20, and Cadet for those under 17.

Medal summary

Junior

Recurve

Compound

Cadet

Recurve

Compound

Medal table

References

2015
International archery competitions hosted by the United States
Sports in South Dakota
World Championship
World Archery
World Archery
World Archery Youth Championships